William Noble Warbey (16 August 1903 – 6 May 1980) was a Labour Party politician in the United Kingdom.

He was born in the then newly created Metropolitan Borough of Hackney in London. He first entered the House of Commons at the 1945 general election, as the Member of Parliament for Luton in Bedfordshire. However, at the 1950 general election, he lost his seat to the Conservative Party candidate Charles Hill, the former "radio doctor".

Warbey re-entered Parliament at a 1953 by-election for the Nottinghamshire constituency of Broxtowe, following the death of sitting Labour MP Seymour Cocks. However, that constituency was abolished for the 1955 general election, at which Warbey was returned for the new Ashfield constituency. He held the seat until his retirement at the 1966 general election.

He was known for his strong opposition to British support for the United States in the Vietnam War, resigning the Labour whip in protest in September 1966, and "subsequently wrote a scathing book about [Harold] Wilson's support for the United States".

He died in Eastbourne aged 76.

References

Sources

External links 
 

1903 births
1980 deaths
People educated at Hackney Downs School
Labour Party (UK) MPs for English constituencies
UK MPs 1945–1950
UK MPs 1951–1955
UK MPs 1955–1959
UK MPs 1959–1964
UK MPs 1964–1966